Yonggomugl Rural LLG is a local-level government (LLG) of Chimbu Province, Papua New Guinea.

Wards
01. Mogl
02. Kagai
03. Guruma 1
04. Guruma 2
05. Muasugo
06. Mai
07. Mai
08. Niglguma 1
09. Niglguma 2
10. Niglguma 3
11. Ku 1
12. Ku 2

References

Local-level governments of Chimbu Province